Zaimabad (also Romanized as Zaʿīmābād; also known as Zaeemābād) is a village in Posht Rud Rural District, in the Central District of Narmashir County, Kerman Province, Iran. At the 2006 census, its population was 392, in 86 families.

References 

Populated places in Narmashir County